Gary Wagner may refer to:
 Gary Wagner, member of Dance or Die
 Gary Wagner (baseball) (born 1940), former Major League Baseball pitcher
 Gary Wagner (disc jockey), disc jockey and radio personality